An exclamation is an emphatic utterance, the articulate expression of an affect.

Exclamation may also refer to:
 Exclamation mark, the punctuation mark "!"
 Exclamation, an emphatic interjection
 Exclamation, a statement against penal interest in criminal law in United States
 Exclamation, a fragrance by Coty, Inc.
 Exclamative sentence, a sentence type